"Antitheseis" is a song by Greek-Swedish recording artist Helena Paparizou, written by Energee and Ilias Filippou. It was released in 2004 as the lead single from her solo debut album Protereotita and third single overall to radios. Following Paparizou's Eurovision 2005 participation and win, the song was released as a CD single in Sweden in an English version titled "A Brighter Day", with lyrics written by Filippou and Adam Baptiste, as the third single from the Euro Edition of her debut album in Greece and My Number One abroad. The music video of "Antitheseis" is directed by Manolis Tzirakis and features Paparizou in several black and white costumes in an opposition against herself, however, "A Brighter Day" does not have a music video. It peaked at number 24 in Sweden, becoming her least successful single there during her solo career.

Track listing

 "A Brighter Day"
 "Anditheseis" (A Brighter Day)
 "M'Agaliazi To Skotadi"

Charts
The single was Paparizou's lowest charting in Sweden to date, but was released with limited promotion as Paparizou had also released the single "Mambo!" around the same time in Greece.

2004 singles
2005 singles
Helena Paparizou songs
English-language Greek songs
Greek-language songs
Song recordings produced by Alex P